Cnemaspis mcguirei , also known commonly as McGuire's rock gecko, is a species of gecko, a lizard in the family Gekkonidae. The species is endemic to western Malaysia.

Etymology
The specific name, mcguirei, is in honor of American herpetologist Jimmy A. McGuire.

Reproduction
C. mcguirei is oviparous.

References

Further reading
Grismer, L. Lee; Grismer, Jesse L.; Wood, Perry L., Jr; Chan Kin Onn (2008). "The distribution, taxonomy, and redescription of the geckos Cnemaspis affinis (Stoliczka 1887) and C. flavolineata (Nicholls 1949) with descriptions of a new montane species and two new lowland, karst-dwelling species from Peninsular Malaysia". Zootaxa 1931: 1-24. (Cnemaspis macguirei, new species).

mcguirei
Reptiles described in 2008